Caleb Charles McCarry (born October 24, 1961) was the Bush administration's Cuba Transition Coordinator. The position developed out of the Commission for Assistance to a Free Cuba. McCarry described the Commission's purpose as to put forth "an intelligent, generous and above all respectful offer of support to the Cuban people" in efforts to end "the dictatorship [that] has willfully and cruelly divided the Cuban family." His mission was described by the Cuban government as "part of a broader U.S. 'plan for Cuba's annexation.'" 

McCarry was previously a professional staff member and subcommittee staff director for Rep. Henry Hyde and Representative Benjamin A. Gilman who chaired the House International Relations Committee. He is the son of the novelist and former CIA agent Charles McCarry. He speaks Spanish and has a degree in Spanish literature from the University of Massachusetts Amherst.

Biography
In 1990, McCarry was director of a Guatemalan project of the Center for Democracy, an organization designed to "promote the democratic process in the United States and abroad." 

While a congressional staffer, McCarry was known for oversight of U.S. policy during the rule of Haitian President Jean-Bertrand Aristide. In 2004, McCarry participated in the Haiti Democracy Project, whose stated goal is to "Help Haiti Move Forward".

In 2013, McCarry joined the staff of the Senate Committee on Foreign Relations as an aide to Senator Bob Corker.  In 2017, he was awarded the Commander's Cross of the Spanish Order of Isabel la Católica on behalf of King Felipe VI at the Spanish embassy in Washington, D.C. for his contributions to Spanish-American relations. In 2018, he helped to negotiate the release of American Joshua Holt from Venezuelan custody. After Corker's retirement, he became a counselor to Adam Boehler, the chief executive officer of the U.S. International Development Finance Corporation.

Cuba Transition Coordinator
According to a BBC News Online article of April 11, 2006, "He says his job is to help Cubans "recover their freedom after 47 years of brutal dictatorship".

The creation of a "Cuba Transition Coordinator" post within the United States government was heavily criticized by Cuban government officials. Shortly after McCarry's appointment, Cuban Foreign Minister Felipe Perez Roque told the United Nations that the United States' plans to overthrow the Cuban government are "delusional".

Several prominent Cuban dissidents, including well-known anti-Castro activists Elizardo Sanchez and the late Oswaldo Payá, said McCarry's appointment was counterproductive, as "[i]t will allow the Cuban government to raise the spectre of foreign interference in the internal affairs of our country."

See also

 Commission for Assistance to a Free Cuba
 Cuba–United States relations

References

External links
Announcement of Cuba Transition Coordinator Caleb McCarry from the US State Department.
Statement by Cuba Transition Coordinator Caleb McCarry from the US State Department.
Secretary Rice Appoints New Transition Coordinator for Cuba, US State Department.
New Planning for a Cuba without Castro, BBC News Online, April 12, 2006.
Josefina Vidal vs. Caleb McCarry 
New post to help Castro 'demise', BBC News online, July 28, 2005.
Condi co-ordinator to take on Castro, The Telegraph (Calcutta, India), August 2, 2005.
   CANF applauds White House choice of Caleb McCarry for New Cuba from the Cuban American National Foundation.

1961 births
Living people
University of Massachusetts Amherst alumni
United States Department of State officials
Commanders of the Order of Isabella the Catholic
International Republican Institute
New Right (United States)
George W. Bush administration personnel
Place of birth missing (living people)